Despite Our Differences is the tenth studio album by the Indigo Girls, released in 2006. The title is drawn from third track, "I Believe in Love" (I still believe despite our differences that what we have's enough/And I believe in you and I believe in love).

Reception

The album so far has a score of 75 out of 100 from Metacritic based on "generally favorable reviews". John Metzger from The Music Box described Despite Our Differences as "the most infectious, pop-infused set that the duo ever has managed to concoct. In fact, its melodies, harmonies, and arrangements are so ingratiating that the album carries the weight of an instant classic." Thom Jurek from Allmusic said it was "part of an emotional journey as complete as can be. More relevant than anyone dared expect. It's accessible and moving and true. It's their own brand of rock & roll, hewn from over the years, that bears a signature that is now indelible."

Track listing
"Pendulum Swinger" (Emily Saliers) – 3:40
"Little Perennials" (Amy Ray) – 2:50
"I Believe in Love" (Saliers) – 3:40
"Three County Highway" (Ray) – 3:44
"Run" (Saliers) – 4:02
"Rock and Roll Heaven's Gate" (Ray) – 3:14
"Lay My Head Down" (Saliers) – 4:20
"Money Made You Mean" (Ray) – 2:24
"Fly Away" (Saliers) – 3:20
"Dirt and Dead Ends" (Ray) – 5:26
"All the Way" (Saliers) – 3:45
"They Won't Have Me" (Ray) – 3:08
"Last Tears" (Saliers) – 4:14

Personnel
David Boucher – engineer, mixing
Brandi Carlile – harmony vocals
Matt Chamberlain – drums
Jeremy Cowart – photography
Sara Cumings – design
Mitchell Froom – keyboards, producer, engineer
Ruby Froom – clapping
Jeri Heiden – art direction
Carol Isaacs – organ, piano
Clare Kenny – bass
Greg Leisz – pedal steel
Bob Ludwig – mastering
Amy Ray – acoustic guitar, harmonica, mandolin, electric guitar, vocals
Emily Saliers – acoustic guitar, mandolin, electric guitar, ukulele, vocals, slide guitar
Geoffrey Weiss – A&R

Additional personnel
"Rock and Roll Heaven's Gate" features a guest appearance by Pink, and Brandi Carlile performs on "Last Tears"

Chart performance
The album opened at #44 on the Billboard charts.

References

External links
 

2006 albums
Albums produced by Mitchell Froom
Hollywood Records albums
Indigo Girls albums